The Iowa Hawkeyes football statistical leaders are individual statistical leaders of the Iowa Hawkeyes football program in various categories, including passing, rushing, receiving, total offense, defensive stats, and kicking. Within those areas, the lists identify single-game, single-season, and career leaders. The Hawkeyes represent the University of Iowa.

Although Iowa began competing in intercollegiate football in 1889, the school's official record book considers the "modern era" to have begun in 1939. Records from before this year are often incomplete and inconsistent, and they are generally not included in these lists.

These lists are dominated by more recent players for several reasons:
 Since 1939, seasons have increased from 8 games to 12 games in length.
 The NCAA didn't allow freshmen to play varsity football until 1972 (with the exception of the World War II years), allowing players to have four-year careers.
 Bowl games only began counting toward single-season and career statistics in 2002. The Hawkeyes have played in 16 bowl games since then, allowing recent players an extra game to accumulate statistics.

Statistics are current through the end of the 2022 season. Performances from the 2022 season are shown in bold.

Passing

Passing yards

Passing touchdowns

Rushing

Rushing yards

Rushing touchdowns

Receiving

Receptions

Receiving yards

Receiving touchdowns

Total offense
Total offense is the sum of passing and rushing statistics. It does not include receiving or returns.

Total offense yards

All-Purpose yards
All-purpose yards is the sum of yardage gained from the line of scrimmage or after change of possession.  It can include rushing, receiving, kick return and punt return yards.  It does not include passing yardage.

Scoring

Total Points

Total touchdowns

Defense

Interceptions

Tackles

Sacks

Special teams

Field goals made

Longest Field Goal

Punting

References

Iowa